Petroleum And Explosives Safety Organisation (PESO) is a department formed by Government of India under Department for the Promotion of Industry and Internal Trade under Ministry of Commerce and Industry, to administer Explosives Act 1884,Explosive Substance Act, Petroleum (Production) Act 1934, Inflammable substance Act 1952 and Environment Protection Act 1986 to control import, export, transport, storage and usage of explosive materials, flammable materials, pressure vessels, cryogenic vessels, design and installation of all necessary and relevant infrastructure etc. PESO is a regulatory authority with autonomous status. The Department is headed by Chief Controller of Explosives and is headquartered at Nagpur in the State of Maharashtra in India. The authority framed various rules like Petroleum Rules 2002, Explosive Rules 2008, Gas Cylinder Rules 2002, Static & Mobile Pressure Vessels (Unfired) 2016, Ammonium Nitrate Rules, Calcium Carbide Rules 1987, Cinematographic Films Rules, 1948 etc.

It was established during the British India in 1890s as Department of Explosives and later expanded to various other activities. PESO is known for one of the most efficient departments in India. The officers are selected by the UPSC into Indian Petroleum and Explosives Safety Service, a central civil services cadre.

See also
 Oil Industry Safety Directorate

References

External links
 
 
 
 
 
 

Government agencies of India
Explosives
Standards of India